Frankenthal is a municipality in eastern Saxony, Germany. It belongs to the district of Bautzen and lies west of the eponymous city. It is named after Frankish colonists who settled in Lusatia ca. 1200.

Frankenthal is situated at the northern edge of the Lausitzer Bergland (Lusatian Hills), near the city of Bischofswerda.

References

Sources

External links 

www.frankenthal-sachsen.de

Populated places in Bautzen (district)